"" is a song by Italian singers Mahmood and Blanco, released by Island Records and Universal Music on 2 February 2022.

"" broke the record for the most streams in one day on Spotify in Italy. It topped the Italian and the Swiss official singles charts. It reached the top ten in Iceland, Lithuania and Israel, charted in eight other territories, and has since been certified sextuple platinum in Italy.

Music video
The music video for "", directed by Attilio Cusani, was shot in Amsterdam and in the concert hall Musis in Arnhem and released on 2 February 2022 via Mahmood's YouTube channel. , the YouTube video has over 58 million views.

Eurovision Song Contest

"Brividi" ultimately won the competition, and the performers accepted to participate at the contest in Turin.

Italy automatically qualified to the final of the contest, which included two semi finals, as the host nation and a member of the "Big Five", the contest's main sponsoring countries. In the final, held on 14 May 2022, "Brividi" was drawn to perform as the 9th entry out of 25, and placed 6th overall with 268 points, based on 7th place rank from juries and 8th from the public.

Personnel
Credits adapted from Tidal.
 Michelangelo – producer, composer
 Mahmood – associated performer, author, vocals
 Blanco – associated performer, author, vocals

Charts

Weekly charts

Year-end charts

Certifications

References

2022 songs
2022 singles
Mahmood (singer) songs
Blanco (singer) songs
Songs written by Mahmood
Sanremo Music Festival songs
Number-one singles in Italy
Number-one singles in Switzerland
Songs written by Blanco (singer)
Island Records singles
Universal Music Group singles
Eurovision songs of 2022
Eurovision songs of Italy